Christopher Harder (born 1948 in North Vancouver, British Columbia, Canada) is a lawyer based in Auckland, New Zealand.

Harder is a well known criminal lawyer in New Zealand with a penchant for self-promotion who has defended several high-profile murder cases, including the Peter Plumley-Walker case about which he later wrote the book Mercy, Mistress, Mercy, and claims to have been jailed in Fiji when attempting to represent eight Rotuman chiefs opposed to the Rambuka regime.

in 2003 Criminal lawyer Christopher Harder has escaped conviction for assault after claiming he had been using a weight-loss drug at the time that could cause agitation and overreaction.
Harder admitted the two charges of common assault when he appeared in the North Shore District Court yesterday. He had been accused of punching fellow high-profile criminal lawyer Barry Hart during a courtroom scuffle.
The 55-year-old was discharged without conviction after volunteering to pay a $1000 donation to the SPCA - apparently because Mr Hart is a horse-lover - and $500 in court costs.

Harder also argued that a conviction might prevent the overseas travel that has seen him offer to act as a negotiator in various conflicts around the world.
The hearing was held in the same courtroom where Harder attacked Mr Hart in May after a row in the police cells over who would represent alleged double-murderer Wen Hui Cui.
The court heard how Harder had been briefed to act for Cui and was interviewing him in a cell when Mr Hart knocked on the door.

There was a "heated derogatory verbal exchange" before Harder pushed Mr Hart out the door and against a concrete wall.
In the words of presiding judge Christopher Harding, Harder then put his "closed fist in contact with [Hart's] face in an exaggerated, slow and threatening manner four times".
They clashed again later in the courtroom upstairs where, after some more eyeballing, Harder punched Mr Hart in the stomach.

Although Mr Hart did not lay a complaint, Harder was charged in August after an investigation headed by a high-ranking detective.
For Harder, Peter Williams, QC, said Mr Hart should take some blame for creating a stressful situation but it was not an attempt "to pass the buck".
"The whole essence of being a barrister is to be a gentleman and this [Harder's behaviour] was ungentlemanly conduct."

The court was given evidence of Harder's use of the prescription-only weight loss drug Duromine at the time.
A medical certificate from Dr Graham Wardhope confirmed the lawyer had been prescribed the drug three days earlier and said it was "an adrenaline derivative that in initial stages of use could cause an overreaction in a high-stress situation".

There was also an affidavit from barrister Melanie Coxon, who said she had noticed Harder had been "unusually titchy and out of character" in the weekend before the attack. She had told him to check out the medication.
Police opposed the application for a discharge without conviction.

They had earlier denied Harder diversion because he was "an officer of the court".
A charge of common assault carries a maximum penalty of six months in prison and a $4000 fine.

Judge Harding accepted Harder's application for the discharge after considering whether the conviction would be out of proportion to the offending.
He took into account the use of the drug and the way convictions made it difficult to travel in the post-September 11 world, as well as his guilty plea and lack of previous convictions.
Harder's actions are still under investigation by the Auckland District Law Society. Mr Hart is now representing Cui, who allegedly slit his girlfriend's throat then stabbed her friend in April.

Outside the court, Mr Harder said he hoped he and Mr Hart could be friends again. He also said he had stopped taking duromine since the incident.
"I have a treadmill in my office now."

Christopher Harder has acted in many high-profile criminal cases, including the Parnell Panther rape cases and the Peter Plumley-Walker and Michael Choy murder trials. Since 1993 he has attempted to resolve some of the world's ugliest standoffs in troublespots including Fiji, Waco, in Texas, Peru, the Balkans and Pakistan.

In 2006 he was struck off the law practitioners roll by the law practitioner's disciplinary tribunal for several offences including taking a client to a brothel, making him simulate the sexual violence he had been charged with committing, swearing at the client and drinking alcohol while taking instructions, sexual harassment and threatening clients. He claims to have reformed and in 2008 applied to be restored to the roll, but withdrew his application when he saw new evidence was to be introduced.

In 2007 he was controversially permitted to practice law in Tonga to defend people charged following the riots in Nukualofa in 2006 despite still being struck off in New Zealand.

 In 2017 former defence lawyer Christopher Harder began filming a feature-length film about the murder of Peter Plumley-Walker in Auckland playing himself. 
The NZ Rotorua Police headed by Inspector Ron Cooper and 2 i/c Detective Sergeant John Dewar  began the Plumley Walker murder investigation after the decomposing body of cricket umpire Plumley-Walker was found floating in the Huka Falls with its hands and feet bound, allegedly after a bondage session gone wrong in 1989. Teenage dominatrix Renee Chignell, then 18, and her boyfriend Neville Walker, represented by Harder, were originally convicted of murder.

In October 2016 it was announced that TVNZ was making a dramatization of the infamous case as part of its Sunday Theatre programming titled Mercy Mistress. 
Harder said he declined to participate  in the TVNZ production after reading their script as it left out critical details and was overly sympathetic to Renee Chignell. 
Instead he and MNC Director Mr. Ken Khan decided to make their own film about the Plumley Walker murder scandal and release it after the TVNZ docu-drama Mercy, Mistress had been released.

Dominatrix Renee Chignell and her boyfriend Neville Walker were both charged but acquitted after three trials. Both were convicted of murder after the first trial. Harder acted for Walker. After winning a retrial on appeal Chignell and Walker faced a second trial which ended in a hung jury. At the third trial in June 1991 both were acquitted of murder. The Plumley Walker murder trials saga is believed to be the only case were two individuals have faced three murder trials but acquitted after three trials when a jury accepted their defence that Plumley-Walker was already dead when they threw his body off the Falls, he having died accidentally during a 'punishment' session.

Christopher Harder will appear in the feature film on the Peter Plumley-Walker case [working title Fighting Words].

In a statement released by local MNC director Ken Khan was "convinced he could not find a movie actor capable of portraying the legal know-how and passion of [Harder]," told Harder if he could lose 10 kilo Khan would cast Harder to play himself. After attending Jenny Craig for four months Harder achieved his weight lose goal and was accepted for the key role playing himself.

Harder has long been interested in taking the case to the screen, having paid $300 for the judge's bench, the dock, jury bench and registrar's desk from the courtroom with the intention of using them as film props in 1991.
The once-murder accused even joined Harder in court to help collect the props. Other cast members include Chris Lane, playing psychiatrist Dr Greg, and Auckland-based actress Hannah Martin playing Harder's personal assistant, Misty.  Cameras would roll after the holiday season, with additional cast and crew joining from overseas to complete court scenes and scenes at Huka Falls. The Media Network Corporation said they anticipate the film will be released before Christmas 2018.

On 23 November 2020, the third anniversary of the November 2017 Supreme Court decision that ruled that the 2014 decision by WorkSafe to drop all charges against former Pike River mine boss Peter Whittall as unlawful, the New Zealand Law Society confirmed in a letter to former lawyer Christopher Harder, who lodged a formal complaint in October 2020, that the matter is being referred to a Standards Committee "for consideration of commencing an investigation of its own motion". The complaint, viewed by the NZ Herald, claims that Whittall's lawyer Stuart Grieve QC and then Crown Prosecutor for Christchurch Brent Stanaway brought the legal profession into disrepute by entering into an "unlawful agreement to pay money for the dropping of all charges" and "stifling a prosecution by deliberately misleading and deceiving the sentencing judge [District Court Judge Jane Farish]". Harder told Stuff "I hope the fact that the Law Society is finally looking at this unlawful agreement to stifle the WorkSafe prosecutions gives the deceased miners families here some little peace of mind and a little hope that there might still be a little justice to come." Harder did not wish to be considered the complainant or a party to the complaint, but described himself to the law society as "a messenger". He felt the society should have begun this investigation without his correspondence."

References 

1948 births
Living people
20th-century New Zealand lawyers
21st-century New Zealand lawyers